is a Japanese entertainment company, producer of collectible card games and trading cards, publisher of mobile apps and games, promotional items and many other venues, which was founded in 2007 by Takaaki Kidani and is headquartered in Tokyo. Bushiroad created and owns various media franchises such as Tantei Opera Milky Holmes. Since 2019, Bushiroad is listed on the Tokyo Stock Exchange and has traded on the TSE since its launch on July 24, 2019.

On January 29, 2012, Bushiroad announced that it had fully acquired New Japan Pro-Wrestling, a major professional wrestling promotion, for ¥500 million. In October 2019, Bushiroad acquired World Wonder Ring Stardom, a Joshi puroresu promotion.

At the 2012 Tokyo Game Show, Bushiroad announced Bushimo, a new social gaming platform for smartphones, which was released in Winter 2012.

In March 2013, Bushiroad announced the revival of the media franchise Neppu Kairiku Bushi Road, with an anime television that aired on December 31, 2013 as a collaboration between Bushiroad, Bandai Visual, Nitroplus, and Kinema Citrus.

Bushiroad introduced a monthly magazine in September 2013 titled . It features manga serializations of their various trading card games and other franchises.

Bushiroad created the media franchise BanG Dream! in January 2015, which consists of a musical group, several manga series and an anime television series. It also created the media franchise Shōjo Kageki Revue Starlight in 2017, which consists of a musical and an anime television series.

On December 12, 2019, Bushiroad and Kadokawa acquired each of them a total of 31.8% of Kinema Citrus. The three companies previously announced a partnership in the same year for the creation of different anime, and one of the reasons for the deal was due to that partnership and a day later Bushiroad announced that it had acquired 8.2% of Sanzigen with Ultra Super Pictures owning 75.4% of Sanzigen and studio president Hiroaki Matsuura owning 16.4% of the company. On March 16, 2021, Bushiroad acquired a 50.625% controlling stake in video game company Frontwing.

Overview 
In the beginning of the company was an associated in six distinct subgroups that later merged into one entity. The two most important companies that extended the company's global market were in subsidiary which was created on November 12, 2010, to expand the company to market overseas for Collectible card games. On May 18, 2012 Bushiroad set up a subsidiary called Bushiroad USA Inc., which is located in Los Angeles, California to help them demand and increased interest in the company in those markets. The company also has large number of stores offering its products in Australia, Canada, China, France, Germany, United Kingdom, Colombia, and Hong Kong.

 Bushiroad USA, Inc.
Bushiroad USA Inc. was established in Los Angeles, California on May 18, 2012, to better cater to the growing demand and interest in Bushiroad products from both players and retailers in the USA.
 Bushiroad International Pte., Inc.
Bushiroad International Pte Ltd was established in Singapore on November 12, 2011 in order to expand the overseas market for Bushiroad card games. The company was formerly known as Bushiroad South East Asia Pte Ltd before the present name was adopted in August 2017.
 Bushiroad Creative, Inc.
On February 27, 2015, Bushiroad formed a subsidiary to help the company with the trading sales. In May 2016 Bushiroad change the name of Alcard Co., Ltd. to Bushiroad Creative and is currently headed by Kosuke Narita and they moved their headquarters from Warabi, Saitama to Nakano, Tokyo. The company also helps the main company with Merchandising sales.
 Bushiroad Media, Inc.
Specialize in distributing contents via the radio, digital and print media. It publishes and edit the magazine Monthly Bushiroad along with its manga which is then distributed by Kadokawa in the market, make TV Programs and also plan and produce goods. It's also Bushiroad Group's In-house Agency.
 Bushiroad Music, Inc.
Operates a music business and handles activities such as the planning, production and sales of music contents. Bushiroad Music is also highly involved in the production of live events.
 Bushiroad Move Co., Ltd.
Specialize in the production and distribution of internet radio programs and manage a voice acting agency and owns Hibiki brand and the Hibiki Radio Station which is an internet radio station that distributes promotional programs of Bushiroad's various contents such as anime, games, voice actors and actresses.
 Bushiroad Fight Co., Ltd. 
Bushiroad Fight is a company of Bushiroad Group founded in 2016 that owns several sports companies that includes World Wonder Ring Stardom and Knock Out.
 New Japan Pro-Wrestling Co., Ltd.
New Japan Pro-Wrestling (NJPW) is a professional wrestling promotion that was acquired on January 31, 2012 by Bushiroad and is the largest and oldest wrestling promotion in Japan. In 2019, NJPW formed an American subsidiary of the company called New Japan Pro-Wrestling of America.

Sopratico

Sopratico is a subsidiary of Bushiroad that owns fitness clubs and theaters and was founded in 2004.

Bushiroad would acquire 14.5% of the shares in 2019 and then later on October 1, 2019 for the purpose of forming a tie-up with the companies' subsidiary theater company Thearter Company HIKOSEN. Furthermore, on February 3, 2020, Bushiroad would acquire all shares of the company made a wholly owned subsidiary.

Games and products

Multimedia franchises
Those are original crossmedia projects of the company that are made available on different media like manga, anime, games and live events.

Tantei Opera Milky Holmes
Beginning in 2010, it has a voice actor unit for live performances, an anime, light novel, manga and games.

BanG Dream!
Created in 2015, it has an anime, manga, a mobile game and bands made up by the voice actors of the characters which perform in live events with instruments and also launch music albums and singles. A male-centric version titled From Argonavis launched in 2018.

Revue Starlight
Beginning in 2017, it has a unit with voice actors for musicals, an anime, manga, a radio program and a mobile game.

D4DJ
Beginning in 2019, it has an anime, a game, and live DJ performances.

Collectible card games
AlicexCross
Cardfight!! Vanguard
ChaosTCG
Dragoborne -Rise to Supremacy-
Five Qross
Future Card Buddyfight
Jewelpet Trading Card Game
King of Pro-Wrestling
Rebirth for you
Luck & Logic
Monster Collection
Victory Spark
Weekly Shonen Sunday V.S. Weekly Shonen Magazine
Weiß Schwarz

Published video games
Published games through their Bushimo social smartphone gaming service:

BanG Dream! Girls Band Party! 
Case Closed Runner: Race to the Truth
Crayon Shin-chan: The Storm Called! Flaming Kasukabe Runner!
Chaos Online
Tantei Opera Milky Holmes
Tap Logic ～TAP! Luck ＆ Logic～
Senki Zesshō Symphogear XD Unlimited
The Prince of Tennis Rising Beat
Click! Kaitou Teikoku
Bound Monsters
Ren'ai Replay
Kindan Shoukan! Summon Monster
Love Live! School Idol Festival
Love Live! School Idol Festival All Stars
KamiKari: Demons x Trigger
Dragon Strike
Kemono Friends Pavilion
Cardcaptor Sakura Happiness Memories
Cardfight!! Online (cancelled project)
Shōjo Kageki Revue Starlight: Re LIVE
Miss Kobayashi's Dragon Maid: Sakuretsu!! Chorogon Breath

Acquisitions
 Neppu Kairiku Bushi Road
 New Japan Pro-Wrestling (Acquired from Yuke's)
 World Wonder Ring Stardom (Acquired from Rossy Ogawa)
 Sanzigen (8.2%)
 Kinema Citrus (31.8%)
 Sopratico (Acquired from Takashi Oba)
 Frontwing (50.625%)

See also
Joran: The Princess of Snow and Blood

References

External links

 

 
Card game publishing companies
Comic book publishing companies in Tokyo
Software companies based in Tokyo
Japanese companies established in 2007
Video game companies established in 2007
Publishing companies established in 2007
New Japan Pro-Wrestling
World Wonder Ring Stardom
Sanzigen
Trading card companies
Video game publishers
Companies listed on the Tokyo Stock Exchange
2019 initial public offerings